Jannatabad (also Romanized as Jannatābād; also known as Bahrābād, Jannat, Jannatābād-e Hūmeh, and Jannat Abad Hoomeh) is a village in Eslamiyeh Rural District, in the Central District of Rafsanjan County, Kerman Province, Iran. At the 2006 census, its population was 328, in 82 families.

References 

Populated places in Rafsanjan County